USS Marts (DE-174) was a  built for the United States Navy. She served in the Atlantic Ocean in 1943-45 before being transferred to the Brazilian Navy. Renamed Bocaina (D-22), she was in service until 1975, when she was struck and scrapped.

Namesake

Alvin Lee Marts was born on 4 August 1923 at Wilsonville, Nebraska. He enlisted in the Navy at Denver, Colorado on 2 July 1941. Transferred to  he served as a fireman, second class. Early in the Battle of Tassafaronga, New Orleans took a torpedo hit in its port bow which exploded two magazines and blew off the forward part of the ship back to No. 2 turret. Assigned to the forward battle repair party, Marts was gravely injured by the blast and fires. However he assisted in carrying an injured medical officer to the battle dressing station amidships where he collapsed from loss of blood and exhaustion. He died from his wounds shortly afterward. He was posthumously awarded the Navy Cross.

History
The ship was laid down by Federal Shipbuilding & Dry Dock Co., Newark, New Jersey, on 26 April 1943; launched on 8 August 1943; sponsored by Miss Betty Marts; and, commissioned on 3 September 1943.

U.S. Navy (1943–1945)

After shakedown off Bermuda, Marts departed New York on 4 November for convoy escort duty off the Atlantic coast of South America. She reached Trinidad, British West Indies, on 9 November, and during the next five months operated in the 4th Fleet escorting ships between Trinidad and Recife, Brazil. She made two more patrols during the next month; and, after escorting Omaha to Gibraltar on 13 July, she returned to Recife the 23rd.

Between 24 July and 3 August Marts screened the British cable repair ship SS Cambria during repairs on communications cables off the Brazilian coast. Thence, she joined Escort Division 24 on hunter-killer patrols in the Atlantic. After completing sonar repairs at Bahia, Brazil, she sailed to Trinidad, where she arrived on 5 December to resume convoy escort duty. From 6 to 18 December she screened a merchant convoy to Recife; thence, she continued escort duty between Brazilian Ports and Trinidad until the end of January 1945.

Marts joined  at Bahia on 1 February and escorted the cruiser on patrol in the South Atlantic until returning to Recife on 10 February.

Brazilian Navy (1945–1975)

Scheduled for transfer under lend lease to the Brazilian government, she steamed to the Brazilian naval base at Natal on 2 March, and there trained Brazilian sailors. Marts decommissioned on 20 March 1945 and recommissioned the same day in the Brazilian Navy as Bocaina (D-22). On 30 June 1953, she was returned to the United States and simultaneously transferred outright to Brazil under terms of the Mutual Defense Assistance Program. She continued to serve in the Brazilian Navy until struck and scrapped in 1975.

References

External links

 

Cannon-class destroyer escorts of the United States Navy
Ships built in Kearny, New Jersey
1943 ships
World War II frigates and destroyer escorts of the United States
Bertioga-class destroyer escorts
Cannon-class destroyer escorts of the Brazilian Navy
World War II frigates of Brazil